This is a list of fashion education programs at colleges and universities around the world.

There are a number of specialized art schools and design schools worldwide that offer degrees in fashion design and fashion design technology; some colleges also offer Masters of Fashion courses.
See Bachelor of Design and Master of Design.
Design schools include:

Argentina
University of Palermo, Buenos Aires
Australia
RMIT University, Melbourne
Sydney Institute of TAFE
Whitehouse Institute of Design, Melbourne and Sydney
Bangladesh
Bangladesh University of Textiles (BUTEX), Dhaka
Shanto-Mariam University of Creative Technology, Dhaka
BGMEA Institute of Fashion & Technology (BUFT), Dhaka
Design Academy Bangladesh, Chattogram
Belgium
La Cambre
Royal Academy of Fine Arts (Antwerp)
Canada
George Brown College
Toronto Film School
Denmark
Copenhagen Academy
France
IFM Paris (Institut Français de la Mode)
Ecole de la Chambre Syndicale de la Couture Parisienne
ESMOD
Studio Berçot
Georgia
Tbilisi State Academy of Arts
Germany
AMD Academy of Fashion and Design
Berlin University of the Arts
HTW Berlin
University of the Arts Bremen
Kunstakademie Düsseldorf
Giebichenstein Castle Academy of Arts in Halle
Academy of Fine Arts, Karlsruhe
Academy of Fine Arts, Munich
Academy of Fine Arts, Nuremberg
Design Hochschule Schwerin & Leipzig
Hong Kong
Hong Kong Polytechnic University
Ireland
Limerick School of Art and Design
National College of Art and Design
India
 Indian Institute Of Fashion And Design - (IIFD)
ICAT Design & Media College
National Institute of Fashion Technology
Indian Institute of Art and Design (IIAD)
Amity University, Noida
Pearl Academy of Fashion
((FOOTWEAR DESIGN AND DEVELOPMENT INSTITUTE-FDDI))
Apeejay Institute of Design
National Institute of Design
Raffles Design International
FAD Institute of Luxury Fashion and Style
Woxsen University
Italy
Istituto Marangoni
Politecnico of Milan
Istituto Europeo di Design
University Iuav of Venice
Istituto di Moda Burgo
Israel
Shenkar College of Engineering and Design
Japan
Bunka Fashion College
Sugino Fashion College
Netherlands
**[[Amsterdam Fashion Institute]]
Malaysia
ESMOD Kuala Lumpur
LimKokWing University
Raffles College Kuala Lumpur
Mexico
Monterrey Center for Higher Learning of Design
Pakistan
Pakistan Institute of Fashion and Design
Romania
Gheorghe Asachi Technical University of Iași
George Enescu University of Arts of Iași
Art and Design University of Cluj-Napoca
West University of Timișoara - Faculty of Fine Arts and Design
Turkey
İzmir University of Economics
 Tunisia 
 ESMOD Tunis
United Kingdom
England
London
Central Saint Martins College of Art and Design
Condé Nast College of Fashion & Design
Royal College of Art
Kingston University
Middlesex University<
London College of Fashion<
University of Westminster
Ravensbourne College of Design and Communication
University of Brighton
De Montfort University
Richmond University
Bradford College
University for the Creative Arts (Rochester & Epsom)
Birmingham City University
Nottingham 
Nottingham Trent University
Scotland
Heriot-Watt School of Textiles and Design, Edinburgh
The Glasgow School of Art
Edinburgh College of Art
United States
The University of Alabama in Tuscaloosa, Alabama
Parsons The New School for Design in New York City, New York
Portland Fashion Institute in Portland, Oregon
Fashion Institute of Technology in New York City, New York
Savannah College of Art and Design in Savannah, Georgia
Drexel University in Philadelphia, Pennsylvania
Pratt Institute in New York City, New York
NC State University Wilson College of Textiles in Raleigh, North Carolina
Rhode Island School of Design in Providence, Rhode Island
Kent State University in Kent, Ohio
Otis College of Art & Design in Los Angeles, California
California College of the Arts in San Francisco, California
Philadelphia University in Philadelphia, Pennsylvania
Academy of Art University in San Francisco, California
Fashion Institute of Design & Merchandising in Los Angeles, San Francisco, San Diego and Irvine, California
School of the Art Institute of Chicago in Chicago, Illinois
Columbus College of Art and Design in Columbus, Ohio
Columbia College Chicago in Chicago, Illinois
El Centro College in Dallas, Texas
Middle Tennessee State University in Murfreesboro, Tennessee
O'More College of Design in Franklin, Tennessee
Virginia Commonwealth University in Richmond, Virginia
Woodbury University in Burbank, California
Lasell College in Newton, Massachusetts
Cornell University in Ithaca, New York

Elsewhere in the world, Shih Chien University and Fu Jen Catholic University in  Taiwan and the Asian University chain, Raffles College of Design and Commerce, all offer fashion design courses.

There are many universities that offer fashion design throughout the United States, usually within the context of a general liberal arts degree.  The major concentration incorporating fashion design may have alternative names like Apparel and Textiles or Apparel and Textile Design, and may be housed in departments such as Art and Art History, or Family and Consumer Studies. Some schools, such as Parsons, offer a major in Fashion Management, combining fashion education with business courses.

References

Education programs